Burawali is a village in Gangeshwari Mandal, Amroha district, Uttar Pradesh state, India. The PIN code is 244241. Burawali is near ujhari and hasanpur.

Description
This village is famous for its 'bazaar', a weekly market on every Monday. People from nearby villages also visit this weekly market to get their basic essentials, needs & groceries.

The village is also famous as it has two petrol pumps and one sugar mill. The village has facilities to purchase general agricultural animals, including goats and buffaloes.

References

Villages in Amroha district